Now That's What I Call the USA: The Patriotic Country Collection was released on June 15, 2010.

Track listing

Chart performance

References

External links
 . Amazon.com

2010 compilation albums
USA
Country music compilation albums